Todor Stoyanov Burmov (14 January 1834 – 7 November 1906) was a leading Bulgarian Conservative Party politician and the first Prime Minister of an independent Bulgaria.

Burmov was a graduate of the Kiev Theological Academy and subsequently worked as a teacher in Gabrovo and newspaper editor. During the period of Ottoman rule Burmov, along with Gavril Krastevich, came to attention as part of a moderate faction that sought an independent Bulgarian Orthodox Church that would remain linked to the Ecumenical Patriarchate of Constantinople in opposition to more hardline nationalists who advocated a complete schism.

Burmov was a close associate of Alexander of Bulgaria and so was chosen as the Prime Minister of the newly independent country on 17 July 1879 despite the relatively weak position of the Conservatives. Burmov's regime was mostly involved in trying to stabilize the new country, including placing Varna and other areas of Muslim insurgency under martial law. The government largely proved a failure due to the lack of support for the Conservatives in the Assembly and it fell that same year.

Burmov remained a leading political figure after his spell as Prime Minister, serving as Finance Minister in the government of Leonid Sobolev and the second regime of Archbishop Kliment Turnovski. Returning to journalism, Burmov would later leave the Conservatives and become a member of Dragan Tsankov's Progressive Liberal Party.

References

 

1834 births
1906 deaths
People from Gabrovo
Conservative Party (Bulgaria) politicians
Prime Ministers of Bulgaria
Finance ministers of Bulgaria
Bulgarian educators
Members of the Bulgarian Academy of Sciences
19th-century Bulgarian people
Members of the National Assembly (Bulgaria)
Kiev Theological Academy alumni
Imperial Moscow University alumni